The name Ema has been used for two tropical cyclones in the Central Pacific Ocean.
 Tropical Storm Ema (1982) – never threatened land. 
 Tropical Storm Ema (2019) – did not affect land.

See also
 List of storms named Emma, a similar name which has been used in multiple basins

Pacific hurricane set index articles